Shellyann Evans, known professionally as Shellyann, is a singer from South Wales. She won the second series of BBC One's All Together Now in 2019. In 2015, she appeared on the fourth series of The Voice UK, but was eliminated at the knock-out rounds.

TV performances

Personal life 
Evans was born in Rhondda, a valley in South Wales. She currently has 1 son. Her partner's name is Pete, they plan to get married using the money she won from winning All Together Now. She also has 2 stepchildren.

References

External links

Living people
21st-century Welsh women singers
Welsh pop singers
People from Rhondda
Singing talent show winners
Year of birth missing (living people)